Complementarity may refer to:

Physical sciences and mathematics
 Complementarity (molecular biology), a property of nucleic acid molecules in molecular biology
 Complementarity (physics), the principle that objects have complementary properties which cannot all be observed or measured simultaneously
 Complementarity theory, a type of mathematical optimization problem
 Quark–lepton complementarity, a possible fundamental symmetry between quarks and leptons

Society and law
 Complementarianism, a theological view that men and women have different but complementary roles
 Complementary good, a good for which demand is increased when the price of another good is decreased
 An element of interpersonal compatibility in social psychology
 The principle that the International Criminal Court is a court of last resort

See also
 Complementarity-determining region, part of the variable chains in immunoglobulins
 Complementary angles, in geometry
 Self-complementary graph, in graph theory
 Yin and yang, complementary relation between apparent opposites in Chinese philosophy
 Complimentary (disambiguation)
 Complement (disambiguation)